Charles Leonard Levin (April 28, 1926 – November 19, 2020) was an American judge. He served as a Michigan Court of Appeals judge from 1966 to 1972 and as a justice of the Michigan Supreme Court from 1973 to 1996.

Early life and career
He was born in Detroit, Michigan. He attended the University of Michigan where he received his Bachelor of Arts in 1946 and his Bachelor of Laws in 1947 from the University of Michigan Law School. He is a member of the Levin political and legal family of Michigan.

When he decided to run for the Michigan Supreme Court, Levin did not feel comfortable running as either a Democratic or Republican nominee.  He then formed his own party and nominated himself.  He was elected to two additional terms as an independent candidate.  During his tenure on the bench, he gained the respect of many colleagues, prompting U.S. District Court Judge Avern Cohn to note, "Justice Levin has displayed scholarship, pragmatism, insight, honesty, courage, and humanity."

Levin's father, Theodore Levin, was a federal district court judge. His brother, Joseph Levin, ran for a seat in the United States House of Representatives in 1974. His cousin Carl Levin was a U.S. senator for  Michigan from 1979 to 2015. His cousin Sander Levin was the U.S. congressman for Michigan's 9th congressional district from 1983 to 2019. Since 2019, his cousin Andy Levin serves as the U.S. congressman for Michigan's 9th congressional district.

In 1999, Levin was remarried to a former law clerk, Helene White, who has been a Judge of the United States Court of Appeals for the Sixth Circuit since 2008. The couple divorced in November 2006.

Levin died on November 19, 2020 in Detroit at the age of 94.

References

1926 births
2020 deaths
Charles Levin
Justices of the Michigan Supreme Court
Jewish American people in Michigan politics
Lawyers from Detroit
Michigan Court of Appeals judges
University of Michigan Law School alumni
Michigan Independents
21st-century American Jews